Just Fred is the second solo album by the American musician Fred Schneider, released in 1996. Its first single was "Bulldozer". Schneider promoted the album by playing shows with his band, the Slobs.

Production
Produced by Steve Albini, the album was recorded in two weeks. Schneider was backed by Shadowy Men on a Shadowy Planet, Deadly Cupcake, and Six Finger Satellite. Consisting of members of the Jon Spencer Blues Explosion, the Didjits, and Tar, Deadly Cupcake was formed by Albini. Most of Schneider's vocals are in the same style that he uses with the B-52's, although electronic effects are added to "Secret Sharer", and "Helicopter" utilizes a conversational voice."

"Coconut" is a cover of the Harry Nilsson song; it first appeared on a Nilsson tribute album.

Critical reception

The Knoxville News Sentinel stated: "Schneider still uses his distinctive style—an emphatic shout/sing delivery with an ironic tone—but now it's accompanied by heavy angst as he sings about endangered freedon ('Helicopter'), betrayal ('Lick', 'Secret Sharer') and destruction ('Bulldozer')." Rolling Stone concluded that "Albini manages to make all these guitars sound authentic and contemporary, but Just Fred is as much a nod to the late-70s underground scene that spawned the B-52's, when the punk rock of the Ramones seemed just fine alongside the quirky pop of bands like Blondie and Talking Heads." The Huntsville Times declared that Just Fred "borders on inanity at times, but it's just as enjoyable as 'Love Shack' or 'Roam', and no one could argue that those tracks contributed to the salvation of mankind."

The Telegram & Gazette deemed the album "a bomb" and "an annoying drag of a record." The New York Times concluded that "with punk in the middle of a revival that takes itself seriously, Mr. Schneider has latched on to the pop flippancy amid punk's burly guitars ... Schneider treats punk rock as another kitschy source." The Atlanta Journal-Constitution determined that "a few tracks illuminate surprising similarities between Schneider's arch yelp and Johnny Rotten's—'Secret Sharer' could be a Never Mind the Bollocks outtake."

AllMusic called the album "a surprisingly enjoyable fusion of Schneider's bizarre charm and lean, loud alternative rock that proudly illustrates his punk roots."

Track listing
All lyrics by Fred Schneider, music written as noted, except "Coconut" which is written by Harry Nilsson

 "Whip" (Tim Mosher)
 "Helicopter" (Richard Barone)
 "Sugar in My Hog" † (Shadowy Men on a Shadowy Planet)
 "Bulldozer" (Mosher)
 "Coconut" (Arranged by Richard Barone)
 "Center of the Universe" (John Coté)
 "Radioactive Lady Eyeball" (Mosher)
 "Lick" † (Shadowy Men on a Shadowy Planet)
 "Bad Dream" †† (Richard Barone, Gary Lucas)
 "Secret Sharer" † (Mosher)
 "Stroke of Genius" †† (Mosher)

† = performed by Shadowy Men on a Shadowy Planet
†† =  performed by Six Finger Satellite
All others performed by Deadly Cupcake

Personnel
Fred Schneider – piano; keyboards; vocals for all tracks
Richard Barone - co-writer, "Helicopter", "Bad Dream"; arranger, "Coconut"
Shadowy Men on a Shadowy Planet
Reid Diamond - bass
Don Pyle - drums
Brian Connelly - guitars
Six Finger Satellite
Jay Ryan - TFA couplet maximizer
Richard Pelletier - drums
John MacLean - guitar, synth
James Apt - bass
Deadly Cupcake
Rick Sims - guitar
Russell Simins - drums
Tom Zaluckyj - bass

References

Fred Schneider albums
1996 albums
Reprise Records albums
Albums produced by Steve Albini